= PERSIANN =

PERSIANN, "Precipitation Estimation from Remotely Sensed Information using Artificial Neural Networks", is a satellite-based precipitation retrieval algorithm that provides near real-time rainfall information. The algorithm uses infrared (IR) satellite data from global geosynchronous satellites as the primary source of precipitation information. Precipitation from IR images is based on statistical relationship between cloud top temperature and precipitation rates. The IR-based precipitation estimates are then calibrated using satellite microwave data available from low Earth orbit satellites (e.g., Tropical Rainfall Measuring Mission Microwave Imager, Special Sensor Microwave Imager, Advanced Microwave Scanning Radiometer‐Earth observing system). The calibration technique relies on an adaptive training algorithm that updates the retrieval parameters when microwave observations become available (approximately at 3 hours intervals).

The PERSIANN satellite precipitation data sets have been validated with ground-based observations and other satellite data products. The PERSIANN data has been used in a wide variety of studies including hydrologic modeling, drought monitoring, soil moisture analysis, and flood forecasting. The PERSIANN data are freely available to the public.
